Thyroid dyshormonogenesis is a rare condition due to genetic defects in the synthesis of thyroid hormones.

It is due to either deficiency of thyroid enzymes, inability to concentrate, or ineffective binding.

Signs and symptoms

Patients develop hypothyroidism with a goiter.

Cause
This is due to inability to produce thyroid hormones due to congenital absence of peroxidase or dehalogenase enzymes

Diagnosis

Types
One particular familial form is associated with sensorineural deafness (Pendred's syndrome).

OMIM includes the following:

Treatment
These patients respond well to levothyroxine (synthetic T4) and the goiter may decrease in size if any. They may not require surgery at any time.

References

External links 

Thyroid disease
Membrane transport protein disorders
Congenital disorders of endocrine system